Darwin's Brave New World is a three-part (one hour each) drama-documentary TV series about Charles Darwin's evolution by means of natural selection. It uses reconstruction with present-day documentary between the 19th century and present day. The series was developed to coincide with the 150th anniversary of the publication of Darwin's On the Origin of Species.

It was produced with the assistance of the Canadian Television Fund in association with the Canadian Broadcasting Corporation and the Australian Broadcasting Corporation. Produced in association with the New South Wales Film and Television Office.  It screened on ABC Australia in November 2009, and on CBC as part of the show The Nature of Things in November 2009.

Cast
 Wendy Hughes as Narrator
 Socratis Otto as Charles Darwin
 Rick Jon Egan as Thomas Huxley
 Katie Fitchett as Emma Darwin 
 Joe Manning as Sir Joseph Hooker
 Dan Spielman as Alfred Wallace

References

External links
 

2000s Australian documentary television series
2000s Canadian documentary television series
Documentary television shows about evolution